Riser may refer to:

Engineering
 Stair riser, the vertical elements in a set of stairs
 Riser, another name for a theatre platform
 Riser, a length of vertically oriented piping used to deliver fluid, gas, or electrical signals or power upward
 Drilling riser, a device used on a ship or offshore drilling rig
 Dry riser, a pipe used to deliver water to firefighting systems that is normally kept empty (dry)
 Riser cable, a type of communications cable used to connect multiple floors in a building 
 Riser card, a printed circuit board which extends connectors away from another board
 Riser, a skateboard component which increases the space between the wheels and the deck
 Riser, the center section of a recurve bow
 Parachute riser, strip of webbing joining the harness to the rigging lines
 Riser (casting), a reservoir in a manufacturing mold

People
 Larkin T. Riser (born 1949), Louisiana sheriff
 Matt Riser (born 1984), American college baseball coach
 Neil Riser (born 1962), a member of the Louisiana State Senate (United States)

Other uses
 Riser, side of a terrace (geology)
 Early riser, a person who wakes up early in the day
 Riser (album), a 2014 studio album by Dierks Bentley
 "Riser" (song), the title track